Bramley Training Area is a British Army training camp, located south of the village of Bramley, Hampshire. Opened during World War I as an ammunition depot, the site now comprises a field training area and an Army Reserve Centre at Lapraik House, the base for C Squadron, 21 Special Air Service.

Bramley Ordnance Depot
Bramley Ordnance Depot (known as Central Ammunition Depot Bramley from 1946) opened on the large areas of scrub land in north Hampshire in 1917 for the manufacture and storage of ammunition. A School of Ammunition was established on the site in 1922.

To enable both safe manufacture and storage of munitions, well spaced railway tracks were built both sides of the Great Western Railway line connecting Basingstoke and Reading. The tracks were connected with each other at their northern and southern ends, and the tracks on either side of the running line were connected with each other by means of two tunnels under the GWR running lines. A spur northwards from the military yard reached the south side of Bramley station, which allowed through running services for depot workers. These started in 1922, but were suspended during World War II, and restarted after the war using stock from London Transport's Piccadilly line. The passenger services ceased in 1970, railway services to the depot ceased completely on 1 March 1987 with a special for rail enthusiasts.

The Central Ammunition Depot was served by the Garrison Church of St. Barbara (known locally as St. Barbara's Chapel). The register of baptisms (1956 to 1975) is now held by the National Archives, Kew. The stained glass window from St. Barbara's Chapel was removed to Bramley Church when the chapel was de-consecrated.

CAD Bramley closed in 1978, the School of Ammunition having relocated to Kineton two years earlier. The depot was then, however, taken over by the US Army, which continued to use it as an ammunition store until February 1987, when the last stocks were removed and the depot finally closed.

Bramley Training Area
Following closure of the ammunitions depot, the facility was renamed Bramley Training Area and sub divided into three areas as training facility. Area A is the smallest, where parts of the ITV1 series Midsomer Murders have been filmed. In Area B, located near to the camp's main base, there is the shell of a Whirlwind helicopter on a concrete training area, adjacent to which there is a respirator test chamber. There are a number of other static helicopters including Lynx and Gazelle airframes in various states of repair scattered throughout the site. In Area C the Channel 4 television series Scrapheap Challenge was filmed. This area has now been cleared and the site is undergoing soil treatment.

The Training Area is used regularly by recruits from Recruit Training Squadron, RAF Halton for Exercise Blue Warrior. This exercise serves to confirm that the recruits can successfully operate in field conditions whilst demonstrating basic force protection skills.

References

External links
 Berkshire Army Cadet Force Website
 Scrapheap Challenge 2007 Channel 4 Microsite
 MOD Film location website - Bramley buildings
 MOD Film location website - Bramley training area
 Google map showing basic track layout

Training establishments of the British Army
Installations of the British Army
Ammunition dumps in England
Buildings and structures in Hampshire